Fred Phillip Bromley  (24 July 1917 – 14 May 1988) was a dental technician and member of the Queensland Legislative Assembly.

Bromley was born at Carrington, a small suburb of Nottingham, England, to Thomas Llewelyn Bromley and his wife Amanda (née Hopkins) and arrived in Queensland in 1919. After attending Toowong State School he went on to study to be a dental technician at Brisbane Technical College.

In World War II, he joined the Australian Army and served in the 2/1 Dental Unit until his discharge in February 1945.

Political career
Representing the ALP, Bromley won the seat of Norman. at the 1960 Queensland state election, taking over the seat from fellow Labor member, William Baxter who had moved to the neighbouring seat of Hawthorne.

He remained as member for Norman until 1972 when the seat was abolished and move to the seat of South Brisbane. His time there was short lived as he lost the seat when the Labor Party was reduced to just eleven members in 1974.

Personal life
On 17 December 1941, Bromley married Beryl Lillian Williams and together had one daughter.

Bromley died in Brisbane in 1988.

References

1917 births
1988 deaths
Members of the Queensland Legislative Assembly
Australian Labor Party members of the Parliament of Queensland
Recipients of the Medal of the Order of Australia
English emigrants to Australia
People from Nottingham
20th-century Australian politicians
Australian Army personnel of World War II